Zhandos Ermuratovich Bizhigitov (Jandos Ermuratovich Bijıgıtov; born 10 June 1991) is a Kazakhstani former professional racing cyclist, who rode professionally between 2013 and 2020, for the ,  and  teams. He rode in the men's team time trial at the 2015 UCI Road World Championships. He was named in the start list for the 2017 Giro d'Italia.

Major results

2013
 9th Overall Tour d'Azerbaïdjan
 9th Tour of Almaty
2014
 10th Overall Vuelta a la Independencia Nacional
2015
 Asian Road Championships
2nd  Time trial
5th Road race
 2nd Overall Black Sea Cycling Tour
1st Mountains classification
 3rd Time trial, National Road Championships
 7th Overall Tour of Szeklerland
 8th Minsk Cup
 10th Krasnodar–Anapa
2016
 2nd Time trial, National Road Championships
 2nd Overall Tour of Thailand
 3rd Overall Tour of Bulgaria
 6th Overall Tour de Korea
1st Stage 6
 7th Overall Tour of Iran (Azerbaijan)
2017
 Asian Road Championships
1st  Team time trial
3rd  Road race
 1st  Time trial, National Road Championships
2019
 Asian Road Championships
1st  Team time trial
4th Road race

Grand Tour general classification results timeline

References

External links
 

1991 births
Living people
Kazakhstani male cyclists
People from Petropavl
Cyclists at the 2018 Asian Games
Asian Games competitors for Kazakhstan
21st-century Kazakhstani people